Figure 8 is the fifth studio album by American singer-songwriter Elliott Smith, and the final studio album released during his lifetime. It was recorded from 1998 to 2000 at numerous studios and released on April 18, 2000, through DreamWorks Records. Preceded by the singles "Happiness" and "Son of Sam", Figure 8 was Smith's second release on a major label.

Background 

Figure 8 was recorded at Sunset Sound in Hollywood, Sonora Studios in Los Angeles, Capitol Studios in Hollywood and Abbey Road Studios in London. Initially titled Place Pigalle, after the square in Paris, the title is thought to be taken from a song by Schoolhouse Rock!; Smith covered this song, but it did not make the final track listing. Regarding the album's title, Smith said in a May 11, 2000, article in Boston Herald:

I liked the idea of a self-contained, endless pursuit of perfection. But I have a problem with perfection. I don't think perfection is very artful. But there's something I liked about the image of a skater going in this endless twisted circle that doesn't have any real endpoint. So the object is not to stop or arrive anywhere; it's just to make this thing as beautiful as they can.

Smith described the songs on the album as "more fragmented and dreamlike". The lyrics contain references to serial killer David Berkowitz, the Hindu deity Shiva, actor Bruno Schleinstein, the Hawthorne Bridge in Portland, and the comic book character Sgt. Rock. In interviews Smith asserted that his reference to Berkowitz was intended to be dreamlike or impressionistic. A fan of filmmaker Werner Herzog and Schleinstein, Smith said in an interview with Revolver "How come we have no Bruno S. [in America]? How come he can be a film star in Europe, but over here everybody has to look like they were computer generated?" Smith would again reference Hindu deities at two shows in 2003 when he appeared on stage with the words "Kali - The Destroyer" written on his arm.

Cover photo 

The wall Smith stands in front of in Autumn de Wilde's photograph on the cover of the album exists in Los Angeles, and since his death it has become a memorial to him. It is located at 4334 W. Sunset Boulevard, which is a store by the name of Solutions Audio-Video Repair, just east of the intersection of Sunset Boulevard and Fountain Avenue. It has at some stages been covered with written messages containing lyrics and personal messages to Smith, as well as displaying a stencil of Smith to mimic the photo on the album cover. It is regularly graffiti-ed over, followed by regular restorations from fans. In 2017, the wall was partially destroyed in the opening of a shop located inside the building the wall is a part of. Despite this, the area found on the album cover is still largely intact.

Release 

The album's first single, "Happiness", was released on February 8, 2000. CMJ New Music Report wrote, "While the tune's production recalls the shimmer of XO, it possesses curiously upbeat energy atypical for Smith". This was followed by the album's second and final single, "Son of Sam", on April 11. A music video was released for "Son of Sam", directed by Autumn de Wilde.

Figure 8 was released on April 18, 2000. It debuted at number 99 on the Billboard 200, selling 19,000 copies, and stayed on the chart for 5 weeks. It was Smith's highest-charting album in the US during his lifetime.

The Japanese release of this album included Smith's cover of The Beatles' song "Because" from the film American Beauty and "Figure 8", an abridged cover of a Schoolhouse Rock! song.

The promotional CD for Figure 8 featured cover artwork by Mike Mills, director of Thumbsucker. Smith contributed songs to the Thumbsucker soundtrack.

As of 2004, it has sold 185,000 copies in United States.

The track "L.A." was included on the soundtrack for the 2009 game Guitar Hero 5.

Critical reception 

Figure 8 was well received by critics. NME called it "Smith's best effort to date". Spin wrote, "The record is not a disappointment, it's a progression." The A.V. Club wrote, "Figure 8 is even better [than previous records], a strong collection of lush, densely arranged power-pop [...] and inimitably intimate ballads". Pitchfork described the album musically as "muscular chamber-pop". Tiny Mix Tapes stated the album "dabbled in Spiritualized-style neo-psychedelia".

AllMusic was more critical, writing, "Even if it is a very impressive statement overall, Figure 8 isn't quite the masterpiece it wants to be". Pitchfork, too, opined, "Figure 8, ultimately, isn't as good a record as XO or Either/Or, though the man's not out of the picture yet." Trouser Press called it "a record that feels very different from its predecessors", describing its style as "brisk and busy, up front and confident, upbeat. While nothing here fails the consistent artistry of his work, neither does any of it make the direct connection to a soul and heart."

Legacy 

In 2009, Pitchfork placed Figure 8 at number 190 on its list of the 200 greatest albums of the 2000s, noting, "Not quite as intimate as his earliest records and not quite brash and bombastic like its immediate predecessor, Figure 8 marks a subtle refinement of Smith's songwriting skills" and calling it "one of Smith's most accessible and enjoyable records". Rolling Stone placed it at number 42 on their list of the 100 greatest albums of the decade, calling it Smith's "haunted high-water mark". Figure 8 was ranked 86th on The Guardians 100 Best Albums of the 21st Century list, based on a 2019 poll of music writers. The album was also included in the book 1001 Albums You Must Hear Before You Die. Treble ranked the album at 56th in their "Top 100 Indie Rock albums of the '00s".

 Track listing 

 Personnel 

 Elliott Smith – vocals (1–15), electric guitar (1, 3, 4, 6, 8–10, 12, 13–15), acoustic guitar (2, 4, 9–15), piano (1, 3, 5, 7, 11–13, 15, 16), bass guitar (1, 3, 6, 10, 12, 15), drums (1, 5, 6, 12, 13), Hammond organ (1, 7, 10, 12, 13), pump organ (7), Chamberlin (5, 8–10, 15), harpsichord (3), orchestra bells (3), shakers (11), marching bass drum (12), guitar loops (7, 12), "rolling bass drums" (15), string arrangement (3, 7, 8, 11, 15), productionAdditional personnel Sam Coomes – bass guitar ("Everything Means Nothing to Me", "In the Lost and Found (Honky Bach)", "Stupidity Tries", "Pretty Mary K")
 Pete Thomas – drums ("Junk Bond Trader", "Wouldn't Mama Be Proud?", "Can't Make a Sound")
 Joey Waronker – drums ("Stupidity Tries")
 Jon Brion – backing vocals ("Happiness"/"The Gondola Man")
 Suzie Katayama – string conduction and orchestration ("Junk Bond Trader", "In the Lost and Found (Honky Bach)", "Color Bars", "Can't Make a Sound")
 Matt Dunkley – string conduction and orchestration ("Stupidity Tries")Technical'

 Rob Schnapf – production
 Tom Rothrock – production
 Don C. Tyler – mastering
 Paul Hicks – engineering assistance (Abbey Road Studios)
 Charlie Paakkari – engineering assistance (Capitol Studios)
 Dann Thompson – engineering assistance (Capitol Studios)
 Jimmy Hoyson – engineering assistance (Capitol Studios)
 Steve Genewick – engineering assistance (Capitol Studios)
 Anthony Arvizu – engineering assistance (Capitol Studios)
 Richard Baron – engineering assistance (Sonora Studios)
 Geoff Walcha – engineering assistance (Sunset Sound Recorders)
 Monique Mizrahi – engineering assistance (Sunset Sound Recorders)
 Autumn DeWilde – sleeve art direction, design and photography
 Dale Smith – sleeve art direction and design

Charts

Album charts

Single charts

Certifications

Further reading

References

External links 

 

2000 albums
Elliott Smith albums
Albums produced by Tom Rothrock
Albums produced by Rob Schnapf
DreamWorks Records albums
Neo-psychedelia albums